Hollie Naughton, (born October 21, 1994 in Barnsley) is a professional squash player who represents Canada. She reached a career-high world ranking of World No. 16 in January 2022. In 2016, she won her first Canadian Nationals title. She competed at the 2015 Pan American Games, where she won a silver medal in the team event, and at the 2019 Pan American Games, where she won a bronze medal in the singles event.

On 3 August 2022, Naughton won silver in the women's singles at the 2022 Commonwealth Games in Birmingham, beaten 3-1 by England's Georgina Kennedy. In doing so, Naughton became the first Canadian women to win a medal in the sport of squash at the Commonwealth Games. Naughton also served as Canada's closing ceremony flagbearer.

References

External links 

Canadian female squash players
Living people
1994 births
Squash players at the 2015 Pan American Games
Pan American Games silver medalists for Canada
Sportspeople from Barnsley
Pan American Games medalists in squash
Squash players at the 2019 Pan American Games
Pan American Games bronze medalists for Canada
Medalists at the 2015 Pan American Games
Medalists at the 2019 Pan American Games
Squash players at the 2022 Commonwealth Games
Commonwealth Games silver medallists for Canada
Commonwealth Games medallists in squash
Medallists at the 2022 Commonwealth Games